Patrick Galivan (born April 3, 1986) is an American former professional ice hockey left winger who last played for the Nottingham Panthers of the Elite Ice Hockey League.  In 2009 Galivan won the CCHA scoring title while playing for Western Michigan University and was named Second Team All-CCHA.

Playing career
Galivan played for Western Michigan University for four seasons. In his sophomore year he was awarded the Rob Hodge Most Valuable Player award and the Vic Vanderberg Leading Scorer award.

Undrafted out of university, Galivan signed with the Chicago Wolves of the AHL. He split the 2009–10 season between the ECHL and the AHL.

Galivan retired from hockey after one season with the Nottingham Panthers in the EIHL.

Career statistics

Awards and honors

References

External links

1986 births
Living people
American men's ice hockey left wingers
Chicago Wolves players
Gwinnett Gladiators players
Western Michigan Broncos men's ice hockey players
Ice hockey players from Illinois